The Functional GEnomics Data Society (FGED) (formerly known as the MGED Society)
was a non-profit, volunteer-run international organization 
of biologists, computer scientists, and data analysts that aims to
facilitate biological and biomedical discovery through data
integration. The approach of FGED was to promote the sharing of basic research 
data generated primarily via high-throughput technologies 
that generate large data sets within the domain of functional genomics.

Members of the FGED Society worked with other organizations to support the effective sharing and reproducibility 
of functional genomics data; facilitate the creation of
standards and software tools that leverage the standards; and promote the sharing of high quality, well
annotated data within the life sciences and biomedical communities.

Founded in 1999 as the "Microarray Gene Expression Data (MGED) Society", this organization changed its name to the "Functional Genomics Data Society" in 2010 to reflect the fact that it has broadened its focus beyond the application of DNA microarrays for gene expression analysis to include technologies such as high-throughput sequencing. The scope of the FGED Society includes data generated using any functional genomics technology when applied to genome-scale studies of gene expression, binding, modification and other related applications.

In September 2021, the FGED Society ceased operations.

History

The FGED Society was formed in 1999 at a meeting on Microarray Gene
Expression Databases in recognition of the need to establish standards
for sharing and storing data from DNA microarray experiments. Originally named the "MGED Society," the society began with 
a focus on DNA microarrays and gene expression data.

The original MGED Society was incorporated in 2002 as a non-profit 
public benefit organization with the title
Microarray Gene Expression Data Society and obtained permanent
charity status in 2007. The MGED name was legally changed in 2007 to
Microarray and Gene Expression Data Society to emphasize a broader
scope.

In September 2008, the Society decided to promote itself simply as the
MGED Society to broaden the Society's scope beyond microarray technology
and gene expression applications, yet still
retain the recognized value of the MGED name within the community.

In July 2010, the society voted to change its name to the "Functional Genomics Data (FGED) Society"
to reflect its current mission which goes beyond microarrays and gene expression to encompass data
generated using any functional genomics technology applied to
genomic-scale studies of gene
expression, binding, modification (such as DNA methylation), 
and other related applications. This was formally announced on 14 July 2010 at the society's "MGED13" annual meeting.

Presidents of the FGED Society
Board members and officers of the FGED Society are elected annually each May and start serving in June. Presidents of the FGED Society along with their terms in office are as follows:
 Francis Ouellette (2013–2021)
 John Quackenbush (2011–2013)
 Chris Stoeckert (2007–2011)
 Catherine Ball (2003–2007)
 Alvis Brasma (1999–2003)

Membership

The FGED Board of Directors and Advisory Board consist of volunteers
from academia, industry, government, and journals representing a
cross-section of those generating, analyzing, archiving, and
publishing in the functional genomics area.
Although there is no formal membership, the attendees of
the annual FGED meetings are considered to be part of the FGED community.

Standards
To date, FGED has produced a variety of standards specifications pertaining to DNA microarray experiments. These standards are designed to improve the annotation, communication, and sharing of data and findings from such experiments within the life science research community.

MINSEQE
Minimal Information about a high-throughput SEQuencing Experiment (MINSEQE) is a
data content minimum information standard that describes the essential information needed to
adequately document a high-throughput sequencing experiment for the purpose of
interpretation and replication of the results.

MIAME
MIAME (Minimal Information About a Microarray Experiment) is a
data content standard that describes the essential information needed to
adequately document a DNA microarray experiment for the purpose of
interpretation and replication of the results. It was the first published example of a minimum information standard for high-throughput experiments in the life sciences, and as such, laid the groundwork for similar standards in other bioscience domains.

MAGE-OM and MAGE-TAB
MAGE-OM (MicroArray Gene Expression
Object Model) is a data exchange and data modeling standard for use in encoding 
data from microarray experiments for the purpose of export and import
into software tools and databases via XML files. MAGE-OM is a
platform-independent model implemented in the XML-based MAGE-ML
format.

A new version, MAGE-TAB, has been developed to be easier to
understand and generate by data producers as it is in a format
(tab-delimited) that can be viewed and edited using widely available
spreadsheet software, such as Microsoft Excel.

MGED Ontology
The MGED Ontology (MO) provides a standard terminology for describing components of a
DNA microarray experiment.

The Ontology for Biomedical Investigations (OBI) is being developed as a replacement for the MO. A mapping of ontology terms from MO to OBI is available.

Annual meeting

A major component of the FGED Society effort
has been the annual FGED meeting to showcase cutting-edge scientific work and promote
standards.

The FGED Society has held its annual meeting at venues around
the world since 1999, coordinating with a local scientific organization 
that provides space for talks, poster sessions, workshops, and tutorials.

Past meetings of the FGED Society

Here is a list of the annual meeting dates and locations for past meetings of the FGED Society. All meetings from 2010 and prior were held under the name "MGED Society".

See also
 Minimum Information Standards
 Genomic Standards Consortium

References

Bioinformatics organizations
Genomics organizations
International scientific organizations